Church of St Mary is a  Grade I listed church in Stevington, Bedfordshire, England. It became a listed building on 13 July 1964. It is the Anglican parish church of Stevington, and is part of the Diocese of St Albans

The first church on this site, as recorded, was started in about 880 AD and the tower is the surviving part of this; the rest of the building was added later, and completed in about 1480.  The church underwent significant rebuilding in 1872, sponsored by the Duke of Bedford who was Patron until 1971.

The church has been without permanent clergy since the early 1980s and has relied upon Non-Stipendiary ministry ever since.

It is currently in interregnum, the last Priest In Charge, Rev David Hunter, a New Zealander having resigned the post in 2006.

It is believed that the body of Napoleon Bonaparte's valet from his exile on St Helena is buried in the churchyard, however, parish records are incomplete and the brick vault is too weathered for identification.

The interior of the church boasts some particularly intricate Tudor carved pew ends as well as a fine rood screen now moved to the tower.

See also
Grade I listed buildings in Bedfordshire

References

External links
St Mary The Virgin Church website

Church of England church buildings in Bedfordshire
Grade I listed churches in Bedfordshire